Barechu (also Borchu) is a part of the Jewish prayer service, functioning as a call to prayer. It is recited before the blessings over the Shema at Shacharit and Maariv, and before each aliyah in the Torah reading. Some congregations also recite it toward the end of both Shacharit and Maariv, for the benefit of those who arrived late to the service.

Background
The prayer consists of the Chazzan calling out, "Bless the Lord, the Blessed One!", and the congregation responding "Blessed is the Lord, the Blessed One forever and ever." The Chazzan then repeats the congregation's response, so as not to seem to be excluding themselves.

The Barechu is only recited in the presence of a minyan.

See also
Azaan, the Islamic call to prayer

References

Shacharit
Hebrew words and phrases in Jewish prayers and blessings